Dmitry Fyodorovich Mezentsev (born 18 August 1959, Leningrad) is a Russian politician and diplomat serving since 2021 as the State Secretary of the Union State of Russia and Belarus. Previously he was Ambassador of Russia to Belarus (2019–2021), Senator from Sakhalin Oblast (2015–2019), Secretary-General of the Shanghai Cooperation Organisation (2013–2015) and Governor of Irkutsk Oblast (2009–2012).

In 2012 Mezentsev ran for President of Russia, but was rejected by the Central Election Commission.

2012 presidential campaign

Mezentsev tried to run for President of Russia in 2012. On 14 December 2011, the trade Union Committee of the East Siberian railway nominated Dmitry Mezentsev as a presidential candidate. His candidacy was supported by the then President of Russian Railways Vladimir Yakunin. However, the CEC rejected Mezentsev's candidacy, as after checking the signatures collected in his support, too many signatures were not recognized as valid.

On 19 March 2021, Mezentsev was relieved of his post as ambassador to Belarus by presidential decree. On the same day President of Belarus Alexander Lukashenko appointed Mezentsev State Secretary of the Union State of Russia and Belarus, replacing Grigory Rapota.

Awards
Order For Merit to the Fatherland 4th class
Order of Honour
Medal "For Construction of the Baikal-Amur Railway" (USSR)
Commander of the Order of the Legion of Honour (France)

References

1959 births
Living people
Diplomats from Saint Petersburg
Ambassador Extraordinary and Plenipotentiary (Russian Federation)
Members of the Federation Council of Russia (after 2000)
Ambassadors of Russia to Belarus
Governors of Irkutsk Oblast
Politicians from Saint Petersburg
Recipients of the Order "For Merit to the Fatherland", 3rd class
Recipients of the Order "For Merit to the Fatherland", 4th class
Recipients of the Order of Honour (Russia)
Academic staff of Saint Petersburg State University
Officiers of the Légion d'honneur